Henry Beck Hirst (August 23, 1813 – March 30, 1874) was an American poet.

Biography
Hirst was born in Philadelphia. He studied law, but was not admitted to the bar until 1843, his studies having been interrupted by business pursuits.

Hirst's first poems were published in Graham's Magazine. He afterward wrote The Coming of the Mammoth, and other Poems (Boston, 1845), Endymion, a Tale of Greece (1848), and The Penance of Roland (1849).

Hirst also wrote a nonfiction work: The Book of Cage Birds (1843).

Notes

References

External links
 Henry Beck Hirst at Edgar Allan Poe Society of Baltimore
 Henry Beck Hirst at Allpoetry.com

1813 births
1874 deaths
Writers from Philadelphia
Pennsylvania lawyers
19th-century American poets
American male poets
19th-century American male writers
American ornithological writers
American male non-fiction writers
19th-century American lawyers